Sanjin Prcić (born 20 November 1993) is a Bosnian professional footballer who plays as a midfielder for Ligue 1 club Strasbourg and the Bosnia and Herzegovina national team.

Prcić started his professional career at Sochaux, before joining Rennes in 2014. He was loaned to Torino in 2015 and to Perugia in 2016. Two years later, he moved to Levante. In 2019, he had a loan spell at Strasbourg, with whom he signed permanently later that year.

A former youth international for Bosnia and Herzegovina, Prcić made his senior international debut in 2014, earning 14 caps since.

Club career

Early career
Prcić came through Sochaux's youth academy, which he joined in 2001. In September 2012, he suffered a severe knee injury, which was diagnosed as anterior cruciate ligament tear and was ruled out for at least six months. He made his professional debut against Ajaccio on 31 August 2013 at the age of 19. On 30 October, he scored his first professional goal in a triumph over Montpellier.

Rennes
In July 2014, Prcić was transferred to Rennes for an undisclosed fee. He made his official debut for the club against Évian on 16 August. On 25 April 2015, he scored his first goal for Rennes in a defeat of Nice.

In September, Prcić was sent on a season-long loan to Italian side Torino. In January 2016, he was loaned to Perugia until the end of season.

Levante
In August 2018, Prcić moved to Spanish outfit Levante on a three-year contract. He made his competitive debut for the team on 17 August against Betis.

Strasbourg
In January 2019, Prcić was sent on a six-month loan to Strasbourg. He debuted officially for the side in Coupe de la Ligue game against Bordeaux on 30 January. A week later, he made his league debut against Angers and managed to score a goal. He won his first trophy with the club on 30 March, by beating Guingamp in Coupe de la Ligue final.

In September, Strasbourg signed Prcić on a three-year deal.

In May 2022, he extended his contract until June 2025.

International career
Prcić represented Bosnia and Herzegovina at all youth levels. He also served as captain of the under-17 team under coach Velimir Stojnić.

In August 2014, he received his first senior call-up, for a friendly game against Liechtenstein and a UEFA Euro 2016 qualifier against Cyprus. He debuted against the former on 4 September.

Career statistics

Club

International

Honours
Strasbourg
Coupe de la Ligue: 2018–19

References

External links

1993 births
Living people
Sportspeople from Belfort
Footballers from Bourgogne-Franche-Comté
French people of Bosnia and Herzegovina descent
Citizens of Bosnia and Herzegovina through descent
Bosnia and Herzegovina footballers
Bosnia and Herzegovina youth international footballers
Bosnia and Herzegovina under-21 international footballers
Bosnia and Herzegovina international footballers
Bosnia and Herzegovina expatriate footballers
Association football midfielders
FC Sochaux-Montbéliard players
Stade Rennais F.C. players
Torino F.C. players
A.C. Perugia Calcio players
Levante UD footballers
RC Strasbourg Alsace players
Championnat National 2 players
Ligue 1 players
Serie A players
Serie B players
La Liga players
Expatriate footballers in Italy
Expatriate footballers in Spain
Bosnia and Herzegovina expatriate sportspeople in France
Bosnia and Herzegovina expatriate sportspeople in Italy
Bosnia and Herzegovina expatriate sportspeople in Spain